"(I'm Watching) Every Little Move You Make" is a song, written by Paul Anka and originally recorded in 1963 by Little Peggy March.

In the same year, it became (under the title I'm watching) a hit for French singer Sylvie Vartan, who released it both in English and in French (under the title "Je ne vois que toi" on her 1963 album Twiste et chante).

Track listings

Little Peggy March version 
7-inch single (RCA Victor 47-8302, 1963)
A. "After You" (2:25)
B. "(I'm Watching) Every Little Move You Make" (2:10)

Sylvie Vartan versions 
7-inch EP I'm watching / Deux enfants / Ne t'en vas pas / Les clous d'or (RCA Victor 86.019, 1963)
 A1. "Ne t'en vas pas" ("Comin' Home Baby") (2:12)
 A2. "Deux enfants" (1:46)
 B1. "(I'm Watching) Every Little Move You Make" (1:59)
 B2. "Les clous d'or" (2:00)

7-inch single (RCA Victor 46 005, 1963)
A. "(Watching You) Every Little Move You Make"
B. "Je ne vois que toi" ("Watching You")

Charts 
 Little Peggy March version ("(I'm Watching) Every Little Move You Make")

 Sylvie Vartan version ("I'm watching" / "Deux enfants" / "Ne t'en vas pas" / "Les clous d'or")

Other covers 
The song has been covered by Paul Anka.

References

External links 
 Little Peggy March  — "After You / (I'm Watching) Every Little Move You Make" (single) at Discogs
 Sylvie Vartan – I'm watching / Deux enfants / Ne t'en vas pas / Les clous d'or (EP) at Discogs
 Sylvie Vartan –  "(Watching You) Every Little Move You Make / Je ne vois que toi" (single) at Discogs

1963 songs
1963 singles
Peggy March songs
Sylvie Vartan songs
Paul Anka songs
RCA Victor singles
Songs written by Paul Anka